Johan Arvid Tyrberg (born 20 June 1963 in Tyringe) is a Swedish prelate, serving as the 69th bishop of the Diocese of Lund. He is the nephew of Bishop Emeritus Karl-Johan Tyrberg.

Biography
Tyrberg studied at Lund University and was ordained in 1990 . After serving in various quarters, including within the Swedish Church abroad, based in Frankfurt, he became vicar of Karlshamn parish in 2007. In 2009 he became rural dean of Lister och Bräkne. On 18 March 2014, Tyrberg was selected as a candidate for bishop with Fredrik Modéus and was elected on to the second round of the election, on 1 April, by a large majority. He was ordained bishop in Uppsala Cathedral on August 24, 2014 and installed as bishop on August 30 of the same year.

References

Living people
1963 births
Swedish Lutheran bishops
21st-century Lutheran bishops
Lutheran bishops of Lund